Onythes pallidicosta is a moth of the subfamily Arctiinae first described by Francis Walker in 1855. It is found in Venezuela, Bolivia and Peru.

References

Phaegopterina